Mateusz Kochalski (born 25 July 2000) is a Polish professional footballer who plays as a goalkeeper for Ekstraklasa side Stal Mielec.

Club career
On 21 August 2020, he returned to Radomiak Radom on a season-long loan.

On 21 June 2022, Kochalski left Legia after seven years to join Stal Mielec on a three-year deal.

Career statistics

Club

Honours

Club
Radomiak Radom
I liga: 2020–21
II liga: 2018–19

References

2000 births
People from Świdnik
Sportspeople from Lublin Voivodeship
Living people
Polish footballers
Poland youth international footballers
Association football goalkeepers
Legia Warsaw II players
Legia Warsaw players
Legionovia Legionowo players
Radomiak Radom players
Stal Mielec players
Ekstraklasa players
I liga players
II liga players
III liga players